The 1994–95 Eliteserien season ended with Storhamar claiming their first Norwegian title after defeating Stjernen 3–0 in the finals.

Regular season

Final standings
GP = Games played; W = Wins; T = Ties; L = Losses; GF = Goals for; GA = Goals against; PTS = PointsSource: hockey.no

Playoffs

Quarter-finals
GP = Games played; W = Wins; T = Ties; L = Losses; GF = Goals for; GA = Goals against; PTS = PointsSource: hockey.no

GP = Games played; W = Wins; T = Ties; L = Losses; GF = Goals for; GA = Goals against; PTS = PointsSource: hockey.no

Semi-finals and Finals

Source: hockey.no

Promotion/Relegation

First Division qualification
GP = Games played; W = Wins; T = Ties; L = Losses; GF = Goals for; GA = Goals against; PTS = PointsSource: hockey.no

GP = Games played; W = Wins; T = Ties; L = Losses; GF = Goals for; GA = Goals against; PTS = PointsSource: hockey.no

Final round
GP = Games played; W = Wins; T = Ties; L = Losses; GF = Goals for; GA = Goals against; PTS = PointsSource: hockey.no

References

External links
 

1994-95|1994-95
Nor
GET